Buckeridge Group of Companies, commonly known as BGC, is a private corporate group of construction and building-related companies operating primarily in Western Australia.

BGC is one of the largest privately owned companies in Australia.  It was owned entirely by its founder, Len Buckeridge, until his death in 2014. In 2016, family quarrels over his estate erupted into 22 separate legal actions.

Group structure
BGC consists of the following companies:

The BGC companies were the largest home builders in Australia for six straight years, through their subsidiary companies including Commodore Homes, Smart Homes for Living, Aussie Living Homes, Go Homes, Now Living, Terrace, HomeStart, and Ventura South West.

References

Conglomerate companies of Australia
Construction and civil engineering companies of Australia
Real estate companies of Australia
Companies based in Perth, Western Australia
Conglomerate companies established in 1960
Construction and civil engineering companies established in 1960
Australian companies established in 1960
Privately held companies of Australia